KEGI (100.5 FM) is a radio station broadcasting with a classic rock format. The station serves Jonesboro, Arkansas, licensed to the Trumann, Arkansas area, and is currently owned by Saga Communications.

Previous logo
 (KEGI's logo under previous classic hits format)

External links

EGI
Radio stations established in 1965
1965 establishments in Arkansas